King Library may refer to:

Martin Luther King, Jr. Library, several libraries
King Library (Miami University) in Oxford, Ohio
King Library, library located in Andalusia, Pennsylvania founded by Charles Ray King

See also
King's Library, collections of books and pamphlets from the Age of Enlightenment assembled by George III